"Meripihkahuone" is a song by a Finnish singer-songwriter J. Karjalainen. The song serves as the second single from his album Et ole yksin. Released on 8 March 2013, the song peaked at number 14 on the Official Finnish Download Chart.

Charts

References

2013 singles
J. Karjalainen songs